Asad Khan (born 1982) is an Indian sitarist, music composer and director. He has worked in the films such as Slumdog Millionaire (2008), Jodhaa Akbar (2008), Raavan (2010), and in the Commonwealth Games theme song. He has worked as a music director for films including Beiimaan Love (2016), Dongari Ka Raja (2016), Sameer (2017), 1921 (2018), and Amavas (2019).

In 2016, he was nominated for Mirchi Music Award for Upcoming Male Vocalist of The Year at the 9th Mirchi Music Awards for the song "Rang Reza" from 2016 Hindi film Beiimaan Love.

Early life
Born as Gulrez Khan, Asad belongs the 6th generation of the musical tradition of Mewati gharana, a music apprenticeship clan of Hindustani Classical Music based in the Mewat region of Rajasthan. He was born in family of sitar players. Khan studied the sitar under his father, Ustad Siraj Khan.

Works
An internationally accomplished sitar player, Asad has experimented with Indian classical music and western genres such as jazz, flamenco, rock and classical. He has shared the stage with Indian artist A. R. Rahman, and with several western artists including Herbie Hancock, India Arie, Ann Marie Calhoun, Barry Manilow, Colbie Caillat and Jamiroquai. He has performed at London Philharmonic Orchestra, Norwegian Radio Orchestra and at Deutsches Filmorchester Babelsberg. In 2010, he, along with Rahman, performed at the 2010 Nobel Peace Prize Concert. His tracks, "Mausam" and "Escape", in the film Slumdog Millionaire  received well.

Films 
As a music director

As a sitarist

Awards and nominations

References

External links
 

Living people
1982 births
Mewati gharana
Indian composers
Sitar players